The following is the timeline of the COVID-19 pandemic in Nepal.

Summary

The table below documents the daily growth and change of laboratory-confirmed COVID-19 cases, deaths, and recoveries and RT-PCR tests in Nepal, since the first confirmed case on 23 January 2020:

January

A 31-year-old student of Wuhan University who had returned home on 5 January, was admitted with mild symptoms on 13 January and discharged on 17 January with instructions to self-quarantine at home, after preliminary tests showed he may not be infected. Public laboratories did not have the reagents required for testing, which cost around Rs 17,000 per test and need to be bought in bulk. As there were no other suspected cases needing testing, the officials elected to send the samples to Hong Kong for testing. The samples were sent on 21 January, and the results came back positive on the 24 January. The patient was confirmed completely treated when RT-PCR throat swabs returned negative for COVID-19 in followup assessments of 29 and 31 January.

On 17 January, urged by the WHO, Nepal began screening passengers arriving in Tribhuvan International Airport from China, Thailand and Japan, the three countries with multiple confirmed cases. Eight persons manned the health desk. The airport did not have infrared scanners and was therefore using thermal scanners as preparations were being made to install the infrared ones. The passengers who showed fever were being asked to remain in contact and visit the hospitals if they showed additional symptoms.

On 23 January, Dr. Bashudev Pandey, director of Teku Hospital, was quoted as saying that the hospital was on high alert, while three other hospitals – Nepal Police Hospital, Patan Hospital and Tribhuvan University Teaching Hospital – would also treat the disease. Six beds in Teku Hospital had been allocated for isolation of suspected patients.

On 25 January, a day after the first case was confirmed, the Health Ministry informed that two other suspected patients were in isolation at Teku Hospital. The hospital discharged them in the morning of 27 January without waiting for test results even though the results were due later that same day, raising concerns over its handling of the crisis. The tests which confirmed a negative result for both patients were conducted at the bio-safety level-2 labs of the National Public Health Laboratory, the first such tests to be performed in Nepal. Reagents sufficient for 100 tests were borrowed from the Centre for Molecular Dynamics, and test kits were provided by the World Health Organisation.

On 28 January, Nepal closed down the Rasuwagadhi border with China, bringing Nepal-China trade to a complete halt. Bordering districts of India were reported to be in high alert, and medical personnel had been deployed to various entry points along the Indo-Nepal border.

February

By the first week of February, Nepal reported a shortage of face masks, as people hurried to buy them. Districts bordering India began setting up health desks at border crossings. The Epidemiology and Disease Control Division reported that it had devised its own treatment protocol based on the one developed by UN Health Agency and directed all private hospitals to strictly follow the guidelines. By 1 February, Teku Hospital had handled five suspected cases, all of whom tested negative. On 4 February, the Minister for Health informed that three hospitals had been made capable of testing for the virus, and 43 beds had been made available for patients of the possible outbreak. He also informed that health desks had been setup in Pokhara, Chitwan and Bhairahawa. On 5 February, Nepal donated 100,000 protective masks to China as a gesture of friendship.

A village in Sindhupalchok District reported hundreds of cases with fever, cough and difficulty breathing, starting on 10 February. On 12 February, the district ruled out COVID-19 based on travel history of the people in the village. Laboratory testing later confirmed the outbreak to be influenza.

As of 13 February, Nepal had tested on 19 suspected patients. The Health Ministry said it would start using police to guard suspected patients after a Saudi national admitted to Teku Hospital fled from isolation.

Nepal evacuated 175 people, mostly students, who had been stranded across Hubei, on 16 February, using a Nepal Airlines chartered aeroplane and placed them in a 14-day quarantine at Kharipati in Bhaktapur. Although 180 Nepalis had applied for immediate evacuation from China by 2 February, the effort took almost two weeks, as the government struggled to meet WHO's evacuation standards, and to find a suitable venue for quarantine. The government was criticised for its slow response; a Public interest litigation was filed at the Supreme Court, while the locals around the designated quarantine site in Bhaktapur protested the government's decision which they viewed as endangering to the local community. On 19 February, the Health Ministry reported that all of the evacuees had tested negative.

On 18 February, the Chinese Embassy in Nepal criticised The Kathmandu Post for republishing a Korea Herald piece critical of China's handling of the pandemic, accusing editor-in-chief Anup Kaphle of anti-China bias. In response, 17 editors from Nepalese mainstream press released a joint statement expressing concern about the singling out of the editor, and reminding the Chinese Embassy of diplomatic norms and constitutionally guaranteed freedom of the Press in Nepal; The Kathmandu Post published an editorial criticising the Embassy's actions. The Chinese embassy's actions were seen as uncharacteristic and surprising, as China is known for non-interference in Nepal's internal affairs.

By the end of February, the health desk at Tribhuvan International Airport was screening passengers from China, South Korea, Thailand, Singapore, Malaysia, Japan and Saudi Arabia, but did not have sufficient manpower and equipment to screen all new arrivals. A total of six infrared scanners had been setup; the only thermal scanner had yet to be repaired, but plans were underway to purchase three more. Passengers were not being asked to fill locator forms that would make it possible to track them down later. It was also reported that the government was seeking help from the UN, having failed to procure masks and protective gear due to global shortages. On 29 February, the government formed a high level committee to prevent and control the spread of COVID-19 under the leadership of Deputy Prime Minister Ishwor Pokhrel. The government also decided to suspend promotional activities for Visit Nepal 2020. Nepal suspended labour migration to South Korea. India started screening passengers from Nepal and making masks compulsory for all visiting Nepalis. It was also screening Nepalis travelling into India by land, at various checkpoints at the border.

March

1 March
Nepal announced suspension of visa-on-arrival service for nationals of five countries badly affected by COVID-19 – China, South Korea, Japan, Italy and Iran – to be enforced from 7 to 30 March. It also urged the general public to avoid large gatherings. The passengers and crew involved in the evacuation of Nepalis from Hubei were released from quarantine after all tests again came back negative following a two-week quarantine.

2 March
The Supreme Court issued an interim order to suspend flights to and from countries affected by the disease, in response to a public interest litigation. The government issued a travel advisory against non-essential travel to countries hardest hit by the disease, including China, Iran, South Korea, Japan and Italy. The visitors coming from or via these countries would be required to submit a health certificate. Health checkpoints were to be established at all major entry points from India and third country citizens would be allowed to cross from select border check-points only.

4–5 March
Due to a severe shortage of face-masks and protective gear as well as increase in price following a ban on export in China and India, some hospitals were reported to be sewing plain clothes masks as a precaution. A shortage of hand sanitisers was also reported.

8 March
Qatar imposed a temporary ban on arrivals from Nepal and other countries, affecting almost 40,000 labour migrants with valid work permits who were yet to leave. Nepal Airlines and Himalaya Airlines suspended their flights to Doha indefinitely following the ban.

9 March
The government expanded the suspension of visa-on-arrival service to include three additional countries — France, Germany and Spain.

12–15 March
Nepal decided to suspend on-arrival tourist visa for all countries, with an exception to diplomatic and official visas, to last from 14 March till 30 April. The government closed land border entry points for third country nationals, and cancelled all mountain climbing expeditions including on Mount Everest, to be enforced from 14 March to 30 April. It also declared two-week mandatory self- and home-quarantines for everyone visiting Nepal. Labour permits for all countries were suspended indefinitely, including to workers who were back home on holiday. The government also suspended issuance of no objection letters to students going for abroad study until 30 April. Bihar transport department suspended Patna-Nepal bus services with immediate effect, to be enforced until 31 March, after many cases emerged throughout India. India declared suspension of all passenger movement through Indo-Nepal border, except a few designated checkpoints—Banbasa, Raxaul, Ranigunj and Sunauli—with intensified health inspections, effective from 15 March. The land-border checkpoints with China began releasing imported goods following quarantine procedures as cases in China began to drop. Indian Prime Minister Narendra Modi proposed starting the COVID-19 Emergency Fund for the SAARC region; he also said India could share a Disease Surveillance Software with SAARC partners, and hinted at the possibility of conducting coordinated research on controlling epidemic diseases in the SAARC region.

17 March
A meeting of the high-level coordination committee for prevention and control of COVID-19 decided to add 115 ICU and 1,000 isolation beds in the Kathmandu Valley. It also instructed the provincial governments to set up a total of 120 ICU beds.

18–19 March
The government declared suspension of all classes and postponement of all academic examinations including the Secondary Education Examination until 12 April, the end of the Month of Chaitra, the last month of Nepali calendar year when all schools hold the final examinations. Tribhuvan University and the Public Service Commission also postponed all their examinations. The government banned all passengers, including Nepalis, from EU and the UK, West Asia and the Middle East as well as Malaysia, South Korea and Japan, effective from 20 March until 15 April. It also shut down all cinema halls, gymnasiums, museums and cultural centres, and banned gatherings of more than 25 people in public spaces including at places of worship. Nepal began to see a significant influx of people from India as India saw increase in new cases throughout the country. A noticeable outflux of people from the Kathmandu Valley was reported. The House of Representatives meeting was postponed until 26 March. The Province No. 1 government established quarantine centres throughout the province with a total capacity of 440 beds.

20 March
The National Assembly was suspended indefinitely. The Health Ministry instructed public employees to report on weekends as well, and not leave the Kathmandu Valley. All weekly newspapers published from the Kathmandu Valley ceased their print editions. The US government pledged $1.8 million to Nepal. Prime Minister Oli addressed the nation for the first time since the start of the pandemic and announced a list of preventative measures. All international flights would be stopped from 22 March to 31 March and vehicular movement on long routes would be closed from 23 March. All government services and private offices except those providing essential services would be closed until 3 April. A notice from Nepal Tourism Board announced the suspension of issuance of trekking permits. The outflux of people from the Kathmandu Valley intensified; almost 300,000 people had left in the preceding three days. The Health Ministry decided to halt non-urgent health check-ups and surgeries until 12 April in hospitals in the Kathmandu Valley with 50 or more beds. A full-bench meeting of the Supreme Court presided over by the Chief Justice decided to halt all non-urgent proceedings in courts across the country until 4 April. Nepal government pledged Rs 100 Million to the SAARC COVID-19 Emergency Fund.

21 March
Kathmandu city launched a central help desk and a toll-free 24-hour hotline. Germany pledged an additional one million Euros to its existing health programmes in Nepal to help combat the disease. Around sixty passengers from COVID-19 affected countries that landed on Tribhuvan International Airport were sent to quarantine at Kharipati, Bhaktapur; they had not presented any symptoms. It was reported that Gandaki Province had set up 111 isolation beds. The Metropolitan Traffic Police Division suspended breathalyser tests as well as educational classes for drivers found breaking traffic rules. It also deployed 200 of its personnel to display placards with awareness messages about the disease by the roadside. Nepal Police established coronavirus response units in all its stations and decided not to make arrests for minor offences. The Health Ministry informed that private hospitals with more than 100 beds would not be allowed to refer patients to other hospitals; they were required to treat suspected patients, wait for test results and provide free treatment if the disease were confirmed.

22 March
Nepal decided to close its land border with India and China for a week effective from 23 March. The government also declared a Rs 500 million fund with contributions of a month's salary from government ministers. It also increased the allowances for health workers working at the front desks of hospitals by 50–100%. Kanchanpur and Banke Districts declared lockdowns.

23 March
COVID-19 was confirmed in a 19-year-old woman who had returned from France on 17 March via Qatar, the first case in two months, second overall. She was admitted into isolation at Teku Hospital. The Office of the attorney General asked the Police to release people held for minor crimes under bail or parole to reduce crowding. The Minister of Health declared that all patients of COVID-19 would be rescued as necessary and provided free treatment. Kailali District declared an indefinite lock-down effective from 2 pm. Arghakhanchi District also declared an indefinite lock-down.

24 March
The country-wide lockdown came into effect.

25 March
The third case in Kathmandu was confirmed. The patient had recently returned from the United Arab Emirates.

26 March
Rescue of tourists stranded throughout Nepal was initiated. By 28 March, hundreds of tourists had been rescued and brought to Kathmandu; many were being repatriated via chartered flights.

27 March
Fourth case nationally, the first outside Kathmandu, was confirmed, in a 34-year-old man who had recently returned from the United Arab Emirates. He was treated at the Seti Provincial Hospital in Dhangadhi.

28 March
A 19-year-old woman who had recently travelled to Kathmandu from Belgium via Doha tested positive, bringing the total to five in the country. She had shared a flight from Doha with the patient who was confirmed on 23 March. She had since travelled to her home in Baglung; she was admitted for treatment at Dhaulagiri Zonal Hospital after the test came back positive.

29 March
The government decided to extend the suspension of international flights until 15 April. The country-wide lockdown was extended until 8 April.

April

2 April
A 65-year-old woman who had recently travelled to Kathmandu, sharing a flight with previously confirmed patients, tested positive, bringing the total to six in the country. The Health Minister confirmed that she was staying in her home in Baglung.

4 April
Three new cases were confirmed in western Nepal—a 21-year-old man from Kailali who had returned from Mumbai, 41-year-old man from Kanchanpur who had returned from Uttarakhand in India, and a 34-year-old woman from Kailali, related to the other patient from the district. She was also the first person in Nepal to acquire the disease inside Nepal.

11 April
Three Indian nationals residing in Parsa District tested positive.

13 April
A 65-year-old woman from Kailali and a 19-year-old man from Rautahat tested positive for the disease.

14 April
Two members of a family in Kathmandu which had returned from the United Kingdom four weeks earlier tested positive for the disease. The countrywide lockdown was extended until 27 April, due an increase in the number of new cases. The border closures and suspension of international flights were extended until 1 May.

17 April
12 Indian nationals from Delhi who had been quarantined in Udayapur District of Province No. 1 tested positive. They were taken to Biratnagar for treatment. Two UK returnees, a mother and her son from Chitwan district, also tested positive, bringing the total number of confirmed cases to 30.

18 April
An Indian national, aged 65, tested positive. He was one of the 16 people quarantined in Udayapur District where 12 people had tested positive the day before. The second coronavirus patient, hospitalised in Kathmandu since 23 March, was confirmed completely recovered The 65-year-old woman from Baglung was also discharged from Dhaulagiri Zonal Hospital.

19 April
A 21-year-old man undergoing treatment at the Seti Provincial Hospital in Dhangadhi recovered and was discharged.

21 April
Eleven new patients were discovered in Udayapur District.
A patient in Seti Hospital recovered and was discharged.

22 April
Three new cases of coronavirus were confirmed in Udayapur District. Two patients recovered and were released from hospitals, taking the number of recoveries to seven and the number of active cases to 38.

23 April
Two new cases were confirmed—a 55-year-old woman in Udayapur and a 14-year-old male from Janakpur. Three people were confirmed recovered.

26 April
Two men, both aged 50, from Parsa district, tested positive and were admitted to the Narayani Zonal Hospital in Birgjunj, bringing the tally to 51.

28 April
Two youths, aged 24 and 21 years old, from Rautahat district, tested positive.

29 April
Three new COVID-19 cases, were confirmed, bringing the total number of cases to 57. They were, a 46-year-old male from Parsa, and two males aged 31 and 43 years from Bara district. They had recently returned from Delhi in India.

30 April
Two new cases were reported. Reported cases were a 60-year-old male from Nepalgunj and a 25-year-old male from Rupandehi.

May

3 May
Sixteen new cases were reported, fifteen in Nepalgunj and one in Birgunj, taking the total number of confirmed cases nationwide to 75.

5 May
Seven new cases of COVID-19 were confirmed in Nepalgunj, bringing the total to 82.

6 May
17 new cases of COVID-19 were identified in Parsa district, bringing the tally to 99. Six persons receiving treatment in Koshi Hospital in Biratnagar were discharged after recovery. Three people previously confirmed as recovered, tested positive in follow-up tests, bringing the total number of recoveries to 19.

7 May
A teenager, 16, and a youth, 22, from Kapilvastu tested positive. Nepal's tally crossed 100, and stood at 101.

8 May
The Ministry of Health and Population confirmed one more case in Nepalgunj, in a 16-year-old.

9 May
Eight new cases were detected in Parsa, Udaypur and Kapilvastu districts, taking the national tally to 110. Among the newly infected were 18, 43, 45 and 65-year-old females from Bhulke in Udayapur; 17, 18 and another 18-year-old male from Kapilvastu; and a 62-year-old male from Chhapkaiya in Parsa district.

11 May
The Health Ministry confirmed 24 new cases, taking the nationwide tally to 134. It was the largest single-day increase as of that date.

12 May
The Health Ministry confirmed 83 new cases taking the nationwide tally to 217. Among the infected were, eight patients from Kapilvastu district, nine from Rupandehi, 57 from Parsa, two each from Mahottari, Bhaktapur and Dhanusha, and one each from Kathmandu, Sarlahi and Bara.

13 May
Twenty-six new cases were recorded. Two patients were discharged from hospitals taking the number of recoveries to 35.

14 May
Six new cases were recorded, taking the total to 249. First death occurred, which would be confirmed two days later.

15 May
The total number of confirmed cases reached 267, with 18 new cases.

16 May
First death related to the COVID-19 was confirmed when a 29-year-old deceased woman from Sindhupalchok. Two days earlier, she had been pronounced dead on arrival at the Dhulikhel Hospital. She had given birth on 6 May at the Tribhuvan University Teaching Hospital and had been discharged the following day. She had reported difficulty breathing and visited a local hospital within a few days of returning home in Sindhupalchok. On 14 May, the local hospital had referred her to Dhulikhel Hospital.

The total cases in Nepal reached 281.

17 May
A second death due to COVID-19 was confirmed; a 25-year-old deceased man tested positive. He had come to Nepal from India on 12 May, and had been quarantined in Banke. He had diarrhoea and a fever.

The total number of cases reached 295.

18 May
Eighty new cases were confirmed taking the total to 375.

19 May
The total reached 402 with 27 new cases.

20 May
Twenty-five new cases were reported, taking the total to 427.

21 May
Third death was recorded; A 41-year-old man from Gulmi died in a hospital in Rupandehi. The number of confirmed cases reached 453.

22 May
Nepal's total reached 516. 21 people diagnosed with COVID-19, were discharged from the hospital following recovery.

23 May
The number of cases reached 584.

24 May
Nineteen new cases were confirmed, taking the total to 603.

25 May
Nepal registered its fourth death; the number of cases reached 682.

26 May
Ninety new cases were discovered taking the total to 772.

27 May
With 114 new cases, the total reached 886.

2021 
Dozens fell sick in 2021 on Mount Everest.

Notes

References

coronavirus pandemic
COVID-19 pandemic in Nepal
Nepal
Disease outbreaks in Nepal